Eero Olavi Hämeenniemi (born 29 April 1951 in Valkeakoski) is a Finnish composer, musician and writer. He is an adjunct professor at the University of the Arts Helsinki and he has played

and recorded solo improvisation concerts.

Hämeenniemi has written several books about South Indian music culture and translated Tamil poetry. Recently he has written book on Italy: Napolista etelään (2021) on South Italy, and

Kulkija Venetsiassa (2022) on the musical orphanages of Venice.

Selected compositions 
World premiere details shown where available
 Symphony no. 3 (1999) (Finnish Radio Symphony Orchestra, cond. Sakari Oramo, 3 November 1999, Helsinki)
 Symphony no. 2 (1988) (Finnish Radio Symphony Orchestra, cond. Jukka-Pekka Saraste, 31 August 1988, Helsinki)
 Symphony no. 1 (1983) (Finnish Radio Symphony Orchestra, cond. Leif Segerstam, 18 April 1984, Helsinki)
 Viola Concerto (2001) (viola: Tommi Aalto, Finnish Radio Symphony Orchestra, cond. Sakari Oramo, 12 October 2001, Helsinki)
 Red Earth and Rain (2007) Bombay Jayashri, Avanti chamber orchestra, 2008, Helsinki.
 Yaadum uuree (2013) Bombay Jayashri, HKO, cond. John Storgårds, 2013 Helsinki
 Klarinetiseikkailu (2020) Lauri Sallinen, Saimaa Sinfonietta, cond. Erkki Lasonpalo, 2021, Lappeenranta

References

External links

 Composer profile at Music Finland
 

1958 births
Living people
21st-century classical composers
Finnish classical composers
Finnish male musicians
Sibelius Academy alumni
Finnish male classical composers
21st-century male musicians
21st-century Finnish composers